Marina Apollonio (born 12 November 1940) is an Italian painter and optical artist. She lives and works in Padua.

Work
Apollonio was born in Trieste on 12 November 1940. She and her family moved to Venice when she was eight. In Venice she attended the Accademia di Belle Arti di Venezia.

In 1963 Apollonio produced her first work, Metal Reliefs with Alternate Color Sequences. She shared with other Op-Artists the interest in a depersonalized art, as opposite to Abstract Expressionism. She used industrial material in her process, creating dynamic and fluctuating environments in the user's perception.

In 1965, she became part of the international Op Art movement, meeting and exhibiting with artists such as Gruppo N Padua; Gruppo T Milan; Getulio Alviani; Dadamaino and Azimuth Milan. In the same year she was invited to Nova Tendencija 3, an international group show held at the Galerija Suvremene Umjetnosti in Zagreb, to Aktuel ’65 at the Galerie Aktuel Bern and, together with Getulio Alviani and Paolo Scheggi, the Oeuvres Plastiques et Appliquèes at Galerie Smith in Brussels.

In 1975, Apollonio started making work based on the orthogonal relationship of parallel colored lines. In 1981 she expanded her practice to textiles, showing her works at the Laboratorio Artivisive Foggia and later, in 1983, at the exhibitions Morbide & Trame, at the Civica Galleria d’Arte Contemporanea in Foggia and Testi Tessili, at the Il Monte Analogo Library in Rome.

In 2007, she presented her work Spazio ad attivazione cinetica 1967-1971/2007, a 10-meter rotating disc, in the Schirn Kunsthalle Frankfurt for the international show Op Art, where she was invited to exhibit together with Victor Vasarely, Bridget Riley, François Morellet, Julio Le Parc and Gianni Colombo. 
Her work has also been included in other Op Art shows such as Optic Nerve: Perceptual Art of the 1960s, at the Columbus Museum of Art and  - Computer und visuelle Forschung. Zagreb 1961-1973, at the Neue Galerie in Graz.

Her works have been reviewed by major news publications.

Selected solo exhibitions
 1966 Centro Arte Viva Feltrinelli, Trieste; Centro d’Arte il Chiodo, Palermo; Galleria 1+1, Padua
 1967 Galleria il Cenobio, Milan; Studio 2b, Bergamo
 1968 Galleria Sincron, Brescia; Galleria Barozzi, Venice
 1969 Studio di Informazione Estetica, Turin
 1970 Galerie Historial, Nyon; Galerie 58, Rapperswil, Switzerland
 1971 Galleria la Chiocciola, Padua
 1972 Galleria dei Mille, Bergamo; Imeges 70, Abano, Italy; Il Segnapassi, Pesaro
 1973 Neue Galerie Am Landes Museum Joanneum, Graz
 1974 Galleria il Nome, Vigevano, Italy
 1975 Galleria Temi, Bari; Galleria Method, Bergamo
 1979 Arte Struktura, Milan 
 1981 Centro ricerche artistiche Verifica 8+1, Venice
 2008 Neue Galerie, Graz

Selected group exhibitions
 1964 Il Chiodo d’oro, Centro d’Arte il Chiodo, Palermo
 1965 Aktuel 65, Galerie Aktuel, Berne; Nova Tendencija 3, Galerija Suvremene Umjetnosti, Zagreb; Oeuvres Plastiques et Appliquées, Galerie Smith, Brussels
 1966 Op-pop, Galerie D, Frankfurt; 11° Premio Castello Svevo, Termoli; Premio S. Fedele, Galleria San Fedele, Milan; Sigma 2, Bordeaux - Il gioco degli artisti, Galleria del Naviglio, Milan
 1967 La nuova tendenza, Galleria il Cenobio, Milan; Premi Joan Mirò, Barcelona; Museo Sperimentale d’Arte Contemporanea, Turin; Ipotesi linguistiche intersoggettive, travelling exhibition (Florence, Bologna, Naples, Turin)
 1968 Dodekaedr, Galerii d, Praha; 2° Miedzynadorowe Biennale Grafiki, Krakov; Arte Internazionale Contemporanea, Studio 2 b, Bergamo; 13° Premio Spoleto, Italy; Public Eye, Kunsthaus, Hamburg; Arte permanente, Galerija 212, Belgrade
 1969 , Biennale 1969, Nűrnberg; Kunst als spiel, spiel als kunst, Kunsthalle, Recklinghausen; Nova tendencija 4, Muzej Za Umjetnosti I obrt, Zagreb; 8° Mednarodna graficna razstava, Moderna Galerija, Ljubljana; El arte cinetico y sus origens, Ateneo de Caracas, Caracas; Nuovi materiali nuove tecniche, Caorle; Meno 31: Rapporto estetico per il 2000, Varese, Italy; Plastic Research, New Goodman Gallery, Johannesburg; Grafica italiana d’oggi, Palazzo Reale, Naples
 1970 Achromes, Circolo la Nuova Torretta, Sesto San Giovanni, Italy; Salon des comparaisons, Paris; 3° Miedzynarodowe biennale grafiki, Krakov; Premi Joan Mirò, Barcelona - Screen print 70, Chicago; Kunst als spiel, spiel als kunst, Kunstverein, Wolsburg e. v.; Miniaturen 70 international, Galerie 66, Hofheim; Inostrana grafika iz zbirke, Museja Savramene Umtenosti, Belgrade; Grafica rysunek collage, Muzeum Sztuki W Lodzi, Lodz; La percezione pura, Barozzi-Ricci, Milan; Proposta del piccolo formato, Galleria Vismara, Milan
 1971 Serigraphies duo d’art Geneve, Galerie Historial, Nyon; Grafica internazionale 1971, Sincron, Brescia; Panorama di grafica, Galleria la Chiocciola, Padua; 9° mednarodna graficna razstava, Moderna Galerija, Ljubljana; Operazioni estetiche e strutture sperimentali, Ti. Zero, Turin; Senza titolo, Rocca Sforzesca, Soncino; Luglio 1971, Galleria Ferrari, Verona
 1972 4° Miedzynarodowe biennale grafiki, Krakov; Faites votre jeu, Galleria del Cavallino, Venice; Premio Burano 1972, Venice; 1° Norske Internasjonale Grafikk, Biennale 1972, Fredrikstad; Continuità, Studio d’Arte Eremitani, Padua; 4° Biennale d’Arte Mario Pettenon, S. Martino di Lupari, Italy
 1973 Tendenze attuali, Galleria la Chiocciola, Padua; Xerox, Galerija Studentskog Centra, Zagreb; Grafiska italienska, Italianska Kulturinstitutet, Stockholm; 3° Internationalen Malerwochen, Eisenstadt; Iki 1973, Dűsseldorf
 1974 Sull’opera come campo, Centro Culturale Serre Ratti, Como; V miedzynadorowe Biennale Grafiki, Kraków; Arbeiten aus den internationalen malerwochen in der orangerie, Landesgalerie Im Schloss Esterhazy, Eisenstadt; Norske Internasjonale Grafikk Biennale 1974, Fredrikstad; Accrochage, Galerie Seestrasse, Rapperswil; Grafica dei linguaggi non-verbali, Galleria Zen, Milan; Beispiel eisenstadt, Museum des 20 jahrhuderts, Vienna
 1975 Raccolta Nikol Art, Saletta della Grafica, Gallerie d’Arte La Chiocciola, Padua; Proposte ’75, Galleria di Arti Visive, Parma; Collezione Nikol Art, MPM Arredamenti, Milan
 1976 Grafica delle arti sperimentali, Galleria d’Arte Libera Parini, Como; Grafica delle Arti Sperimentali, Palazzo Strozzi, Florence
 1977 Expo Arte 77, Bari; Il Volto Sinistro dell’Arte, Galleria De Amicis, Firenze;Herbert Distel Museum of drawers, Zurich
 1979 Graphik in Padua Heute, Tiroler Kunstpavillon, Innsbruck; Sixth British International Print Biennale, Bradford City Art Gallery and Museums, Cartwright Hall, Bradford (Lister Park); 10 protagonisti della plasticità inoggettiva, Arte Struktura, Milan
 1981 Arazzi…?, Centro Culturale Laboratorio Artivisive, Foggia
 1982 c.c.c.2, Arte Struktura, Milan
 1983 Morbide & Trame, Civica Galleria d’Arte Contemporanea, Foggia; Costruttivismo, Concretismo, Cinevisualismo, Galleria Civica, Desenzano del Garda; Testi Tessili, Libreria il Monte Analogo, Rome; Libro Galleria Castello, Milan
 1984 Rassegna Internazionale d’Arte Concreta, Cenacolo Cultura, Mestre; Nuevas Adquisiciones 1981-1984, Museo de Arte Moderna, Fundaciòn Soto, Ciudad Bolìvar
 1985 Arte Italiana degli anni Sessanta nelle collezioni della Galleria Civica d’Arte Moderna, Castello Di Rivoli, Turin
 1988 8+1=10! 10 Anni alla ricerca dell’arte, Verifica 8+1, Venice-Mestre
 1989 Black and White, Palazzo dei Diamanti, Ferrara; 51 ideatori inoggettivi della visualità strutturata, Arte Struktura, Milan
 1990 51 ideatori inoggettivi della visualità strutturata, Galleria la Polena, Genoa; E’ ancora futuro?, Biblioteca Civica, Noventa Vicentina
 1991 30 anni di arte contemporanea alla Chiocciola, La Chiocciola, Padua
 1992 Der Kreis, Galerie Blau, Seeheim-Jugenheim
 1994 Crno in Belo ( Bianco e Nero), Cankariev Dom, Ljubljana
 1995 30 anni 1965-1995, Vismara Arte, Milan
 1997 Costruttivismo, concretismo, Cinevisualismo + Nuova Visualità Internazionale, Villa Ormond, San Remo
 1998 Nuova visualità internazionale, Centro Internazionale d’arte moderna e contemporanea, Palazzo Ducale, Revere; 
 1999 8+10= 20! Vent’anni alla ricerca dell’arte, Venice-Mestre
 2001 Nuova Visualità internazionale, Forum Omegna, Omegna
 2003 Arte Costruita: Dal Museo “Umbro Apollonio”, Biblioteca Comunale, Cadoneghe, Italy; Il mito della Velocità. L’Arte del Movimento. Dal Futurismo alla video-arte, Casa del Mantegna, Mantua
 2004 Il Centro Duchamp 1969-1973, Zucca Arte Design, Pesaro
 2005 L’oeil Moteur. Art Optique et Cinétique, 1959-1975, Musée d’Art Moderne et Contemporain, Strasbourg; Prague Biennale 2, Karlìn Hall, Prague
 2006 Arte Cinetica, Spazio Boccioni, Milan; Die Neuen Tendenzen, Museum fűr kronkrete Kunst, Ingolstadt
 2007 Leopold-Hoesch-Museum, Dűren; Op Art, Schirn Kunsthalle, Frankfurt; Optic Nerve. Dalla collezione di Getulio Alviani, Museo Cid, Torviscosa, Udine
 2008 Viaggio in Italia: Arte italiana 1960 al 1990, Neue Galerie Graz am Landesmuseum Joanneum, Graz
 2010 Donne nell’Arte, Galleria Cavour, Padua; Dix dans la recherche pour l’oeil a partir des années soixante, Espace Meyerzafra, Paris; Women From 60’s & 70’s, Osart Gallery, Milan
 2011 Art Paris just Art, Paris Gran Palais; Pinta Artshow, New York City
 2012 Arte Cinetica e Programmata, Galleria Nazionale d'Arte Moderna, Rome; Ghosts in the Machine, New Museum of Contemporary Art, New York; Exposicion sobre el Gruppo Enne de Padova, Marion Gallery, Panama
 2013 DYNAMO, Gran Palais, Paris; Percezione e Illusione: Arte Programmata e cinetica italiana, MACBA, Buenos Aires
 2016 EYE ATTACK, Op Art and Kinetic Art 1950-1970, Louisiana, Denmark; The Illusive Eye, El Museo del Barrio, New York City
 2018 Action <> Reaction. 100 Years of Kinetic Art, Kunsthal, Rotterdam
 2019 OBRES OBERTES. L'art en moviment, 1955-1975, La Pedrera, Barcelona; VERTIGO. op art and history of deception 1520-1970, MUMOK, Wien; Le diable au corps. Quand l’Op Art électrise le cinéma, MAMAC, Nice; L'ultima Dogaressa, Peggy Guggenheim Collection, Venice

Museums and public collections
 Galleria d’Arte Moderna, Turin
 Neue Galerie, Graz
 Fondazione Vaf – MART, Rovereto
 Museo Umbro Apollonio, Padua
 Kunsthalle Recklinghausen Musee Nationale Poznan, Lodz
 Das Progressive Museum, Basel
 Musee Cantonal Des Beaux Arts, Lausanne
 Haus Konstruktiv, Zurich
 The Museum of Drawers, Zurich
 Museo de Arte Moderno, Ciudad Bolivar
 Schirn Kunsthalle, Frankfurt
 Guggenheim Collection, Venice
 Hermès Collection, New York City
 New Museum, New York City
 Fondation Villa Datris, Provence, France.

Bibliography
Giancarlo Illiprandi, "La breve stagione dell’Op", Fotografia Italiana, no. 105, March 1966
George Rickey, Constructivism, Origins and evolution, George Braziller, New York, 1967
Franco Sossi, Luce spazio strutture, La Cornice, Taranto, 1967
Marina Apollonio, "Un’arte fatta di scetticismo", Centroarte, no. 1, November, 1967
Filiberto Menna, Arte Cinetica e Visuale, in "L’Arte Moderna", Fratelli Fabbri Editori, Milan, 1967
Bruno Munari, Design e comunicazione visiva, Laterza Editori, Bari, 1968
Guy Brett, Kinetic Art: The Language of Movement, Studio Vista, London, 1968
Udo Kultermann, Nuove Forme della Pittura, Feltrinelli, Milan, 1969
Frank Popper, L’Arte Cinetica, l’immagine del movimento nelle arti plastiche dopo il 1860, Einaudi, Turin, 1970
Titus Mocanu, "Ambiguitatea sensibilității estetice", Arta, no. 6, 1970
Italo Tomassoni, Arte dopo il 1945 in Italia, Cappelli Editore, Bologna, 1971
Klaus Groh,  If I had a Mind…, DuMont, Cologne, 1971
Cyril Barrett, An introduction to Optical Art, Studio Vista, London, 1971
Lea Vergine, Qui arte contemporanea, Rome, 1971
Lea Vergine, "Arte Programmata", Arte Contemporanea, no. 7, December 1971
Ernesto L. Francalanci, "Marina Apollonio", Art International, vol. XV/6, June 1971
Gianni Contessi, "La IX biennale della grafica di Lubiana", Gala, no. 49, September 1971
Gillo Dorfles, W. Skreiner, exhibition catalogue, Neue Galerie, Graz, 1973
Lea Vergine, L’Arte cinetica in Italia; Manfredo Massironi, Ricerche Visuali, Galleria Nazionale d’Arte Moderna, Rome, 1973
Alessandro Faré, Le Arti Figurative, Mursia, Milan, 1973
Italo Tomassoni, "Lo spontaneo e il programmato", Design, n. 2, June–August 1973
Michel Seuphor, "La tendenza alla ripetizione dei segni geometrici semplici nell’arte contemporanea", Arte e Società, no. 10, October 1973
Luciano Caramel, Marina Apollonio, Galleria il Nome, Vigevano, Italy, 1974
Frank Popper, Art-Action and Participation, Studio Vista, London, 1975
Simona Weller, Il complesso di Michelangelo, La Nuova Foglio Editore, Pollenza-Macerata, 1976
Carlo Belloli, Marina Apollonio: anticampi cromoformali ottico rotatori/cinestensivi a radiazione progressiva, Arte Struktura, Milan, 1979
Karina Tűrr, Op Art – Stil, Ornament oder Experiment, Gebr. Mann Verlag, Berlin, 1986
Angela Vettese, Marina Apollonio, Palazzo dei Diamanti, Ferrara, 1989
Lea Vergine, L’Arte in trincea, Skira, Milan, 1996
Arnauld Pierre, "The Kinetic Eye: Optical and Kinetic Art, 1950–1975", Musée d’Art Moderne et Contemporain, Strasbourg, 2005
Tobias Hoffmann, Die Neuen Tendenzen – Eine europäische kűnstlerbewegung 1961 – 1973, Edition Braus, 2006
David Rimanelli, "Beautiful Loser: Op Art Revisited"; S. K. Rich, "Allogories of Op", Artforum, May, 2007
Martina Weinhart, Max Hollein, Op Art, Schirn Kunsthalle, Frankfurt, 2007
Joe Houston, Ugo Savardi, Bianca Maria Menichini, Marina Apollonio, Columbus Museum of Art, New York, 2007
Christa Steinle, exhibition catalogue, Neue Galerie, Graz, 2008
Margit Rosen, A Little-Known Story about a Movement, in Art: New Tendencies and Bit International, 1961-1973, ZKM, Karlsruhe, 2011
Giovanni Granzotto and Mariastella Margozzi, Arte Cinetica e Programmata, Il Cigno GG Edizioni, Rome, 2012
Massimiliano Gioni and Gary Carrion–Murayari, Ghost in the Machine'', Skira, Milan, 2012

References

External links
 10 A.M. ART, Milan 
 Peggy Guggenheim Collection, Venice

1940 births
Artists from Trieste
Italian contemporary artists
Living people
Op art